is a passenger railway station located in the city of Kitaibaraki, Ibaraki Prefecture, Japan, operated by the East Japan Railway Company (JR East).

Lines
Minami-Nakagō Station is served by the Jōban Line, and is located 167.0 km from the official starting point of the line at Nippori Station.

Station layout
The station consists of one island platform connected to the station building by a footbridge. The station is Unstuffed.

Platforms

History
Minami-Nakagō Station was opened on 1 February 1910 as a freight station to serve nearby coal mines, and began passenger operations on 18 March 1910. The station was absorbed into the JR East network upon the privatization of the Japanese National Railways (JNR) on 1 April 1987. A new station building was completed in March 2014.

Passenger statistics
In fiscal 2019, the station was used by an average of 553 passengers daily (boarding passengers only).

Surrounding area
 Minami-Nakagō Post Office

See also
 List of railway stations in Japan

References

External links

 Station information JR East Station Information 

Railway stations in Ibaraki Prefecture
Jōban Line
Railway stations in Japan opened in 1910
Kitaibaraki, Ibaraki